The Japanese Second Air Army (第2航空軍, Kōkū gun) was formed on 23 July 1942 and headquartered at Hsinking.

History
In June 1942 (Showa 17), the Kwantung Army's air corps was reorganized and organized, and was responsible for air defense in Manchuria. Initially, the 2nd and 4th Flight Divisions were subordinated, but due to the reorganization on May 12, 1944, both divisions were transferred to the south.

In August 1945 (Showa 20) the war ended while the 2nd Air Army was engaged in fighting with the Soviet Union.

Overview

Commanders
 Lieutenant General Yorimichi Suzuki - 1 June 1942 to 18 May 1943
 Lieutenant General Torashirō Kawabe - 19 May 1943 to 7 August 1944
 Lieutenant General Giichi Itahana - 8 August 1944 to 1 June 1944
 Lieutenant General Uichiro Harada - 1 June 1945 until war's end

Chief of Staff
 Maj. Gen. Tetsukuma Fujimoto - 1 June 1942
 Maj. Gen. Kawakami - 19 May 1943
 Maj. Gen. Yoshinaga Park - 20 June 1944
 Maj. Gen. Furuya Kenzo - 16 July 1945

Final HQ composition
 Colonel Eiichi Fukai
 Lieutenant Colonel Katsuo Sato (Strategy)
 Major Tsuruyoshi Shuto (rear)
 Major Ryo Fujita (Information)
 Major Kiyotoshi Goto
 Major Arimori Genji
 Major Keiichi Yamada
 Senior Adjutant General: Colonel Kiyoshi Furukawa
 Weapons Director: Colonel Masao Hasegawa
 Accounting Manager: Tadao Yamaguchi, Colonel
 Surgeon Director: Maj. Gen. Miyoshi
 Special Information Manager: Lieutenant Colonel Ryuichi Asami

Final units
 Independent 15th Squadron: Maj. Gen. Imakawa
 Flight 104th Squadron
 2nd Aviation District Command
 14th Aviation District Command
 28th Aviation District Command
 57th Aviation District Command
 58th Aviation District Command
 Independent 101st Education Wing: Maj. Gen. Mitsuyuki Shikata
 2nd Air Army 1st Education Corps
 2nd Aviation Regiment
 8th Aviation Regiment
 3rd Aviation Information Regiment
 11th Aviation Information Regiment
 5th Aerial Spotting Corps
 12th Aerial Spotting Corps
 8th Aerial Spotting Corps
 2nd Civilian Aerial Spotting Corps
 4th Air Route
 2nd Meteorological Regiment
 Kwantung Army Aviation Factory: Maj. Gen. Taki Noboru
 9th Field War Aviation Repair Factory
 10th Field War Aviation Repair Factory
 11th Field War Aviation Repair Factory
 12th Field War Aviation Repair Factory
 Field 8 Air Supply Depot
 9th Field Battle Air Supply Depot
 11th Field Battle Air Supply Depot

References
 Ikuhiko Hata ed., "The Japanese army and navy comprehensive encyclopedia," second edition, University of Tokyo Press , 2005
 Misao Toyama and Toshio Morimatsu, "Imperial Army Organization Overview", Fuyo Shobo Publishing Co., Ltd., 1987
 Jiro Kimata "The Complete History of the Army Air Corps" Air War History Series 90 , Asahi Sonorama, 1987
 National Institute for Defense Studies War History Room "Army Aviation Arms and Operations (3) Until the End of the Greater East Asia War" Asagumo Shinbunsha < Senshi Sosho >, 1976

Military units and formations established in 1942
Military units and formations disestablished in 1945
1942 establishments in Japan
1945 disestablishments in Japan
Units and formations of the Imperial Japanese Army Air Service